The inaugural 1904 Federal Amateur Hockey League (FAHL) season lasted from January 6 until February 24. Four teams played a six game schedule.

The FAHL had been formed on December 5, 1903. Three of the four teams had been rejected for membership by the Canadian Amateur Hockey League (CAHL), while the fourth – the Montreal Wanderers – was a new team composed of disillusioned players from two Montreal-based CAHL teams.

Regular season 

In their first season as a franchise, the Wanderers would dominate the regular season, going undefeated. Due to an unusual twist, the Wanderers would have to share the league championship with the Ottawa Hockey Club (HC) of the CAHL (see below).

Highlights 

Jack Marshall of Wanderers would score six goals against the Capitals on January 20.

Final standing

Results 

† Wanderers lock down League Championship.

Goaltending averages

Leading scorers

League championship and Stanley Cup challenge 

Just days after the FAHL regular season was finished, the reigning Stanley Cup champion Ottawa Hockey Club (HC) left the CAHL and joined the FAHL. The Wanderers, FAHL regular season champions, immediately played Ottawa HC for the combined Stanley Cup/FAHL championship.

Wanderers vs. Ottawa 
A two-game series between the Montreal Wanderers from FAHL and Ottawa Hockey Club from CAHL was arranged, for the Stanley Cup. The teams played the first game in Montreal to a tie of 5–5. Montreal refused to play overtime, demanding that the game be considered a no-contest and proposed that the series start over as a best two-of-three series. The Cup trustees demanded that the series continued as scheduled and the Wanderers abandoned the challenge.

According to the Gazette, the game saw "the dirtiest game ever seen between two senior teams at the Arena." Thirty-six penalties were called. Leahy was injured and replaced by Mallan. James Strachan, president of the Wanderers was quoted as saying that the Wanderers would not go to Ottawa and play with Dr. Kearns as referee. Ottawa took a 2–0 lead, before the Wanderers scored five in a row. The Ottawas came back with three, the final goal by Frank McGee.

Source: ''Montreal Gazette

The Wanderers demanded a replay of the game to be held in Montreal, which Ottawa refused. The series was cancelled, with Ottawa retained the Stanley Cup. championship. Ottawa then joined FAHL in the offseason..

Exhibition 
After the season, the Wanderers travelled to Michigan to play the Portage Lakes Hockey Club pro club. The Wanderers lost to Portage Lakes 8-4 and 9-2 in a series dubbed the "World Championship" locally. The Wanderers next travelled to Pittsburgh to play the Pittsburgh Victorias. Pittsburgh won 4-2, and 6-4.

See also 
 1903–04 Montreal Wanderers season
 1904 CAHL season
 List of pre-NHL seasons

References 

 

Federal Amateur Hockey League seasons
1903–04 in Canadian ice hockey by league